Seng Ching Hong (commonly referred to as James Seng) is one of the Internet pioneers in Singapore and is recognized as an international expert in the Internet arena. He gave regular speeches at various forums on several Internet issues such as IDN, VoIP, IPv6, spam, OSS and Internet governance issues. James also participates actively in several standard organizations (such as ISO/IEC JTC1 and IETF) and also served on the board/committee of several Internet organizations.

Biography 

James Seng started his career at TechNet, the first Internet Service Provider in Singapore, in 1993 when he was still a student at the National University of Singapore. In late 1998, he co-founded i-DNS.net and served as the company's Chief Technology Officer for 3 years. Under his guidance, the company expanded its presence worldwide.

James also developed several Internet software and services such as PObox (1995), a web-based email and forwarding service which has been licensed and commercialized by Singapore Press Holdings now known as PostOne and Singapore InfoMAP (1994), the official website for Singapore, which is currently operated by Infocomm Media Development Authority (IMDA).

James Seng was formerly the co-chair of the Internationalized Domain Names Working Group that is responsible for the standardization of IDN.

James Seng was formerly the Assistant Director of Enabler Technologies at the IMDA. James' team is responsible for tracking emerging and disruptive technologies on the Internet, IP Telephony, open source software, information exchange, social software, antispam and other related fields.

In 2008, James started Thymos Capital LLP, an incubator based in Singapore focusing in helping young entrepreneurs.

Previously, James was the SVP of Technology of PPLive.

James received the 2019 Communications Quality & Reliability (CQR) Chairman's Award from IEEE's Technical Committee.

References

External links 
 James Seng's Blog

Year of birth missing (living people)
Living people
Singaporean people of Chinese descent
Singaporean businesspeople